Bartolomé Gamundi, born in the Dominican Republic, is a businessman who was appointed by Governor Aníbal Acevedo Vilá as his last Secretary of the Puerto Rico Department of Economic Development and Commerce and president of the Commerce and Export Company of the government of Puerto Rico and confirmed unanimously by the Senate of Puerto Rico on June 30, 2008. Prior to obtaining a bachelor's degree in industrial engineering at McGill University in Montreal, Quebec, Canada, he studied at the University of Puerto Rico at Mayagüez. His master's degree is from the Interamerican University of Puerto Rico.

A former general manager at Electro Biology Corp., and a former executive at Arthur Andersen, Price Waterhouse, GE and Weston Instruments, Gamundi is a former president of the Puerto Rico Manufacturers Association and of the Puerto Rico Chamber of Commerce. First as Chamber President and subsequently as Secretary of Economic Development, he was a member of the multi-sectorial committee that drafted Puerto Rico's Economic Development Law passed in June 2008. Gamundi serves as a business book reviewer for the Sunday business section of El Nuevo Día, Puerto Rico's highest circulation daily newspaper.

Books

Nuevas Direcciones para Líderes y Organizaciones del Futuro, July 2000
La sociedad del conocimiento. 10 estrategias para transformar el mundo empresarial

Awards and recognitions

President, Puerto Rico Manufacturers Association
President, Puerto Rico Chamber of Commerce (resigned in midterm upon appointment to the Governor's cabinet)
Reach for Excellence Award, Electro-Biology Inc.
Boy Scouts of America, Exemplary Citizen Award, 1987
Industrial Engineer of the Year, Puerto Rico Institute of Industrial Engineers, 1994
Top 10 Businessmen, Caribbean Business newspaper, 1996
Distinguished Alumni, Interamerican University, 1996
Presidential Medal for Civic Merit, awarded by the President of the Dominican Republic, 2002
Héctor Jiménez Juarbe Award, Puerto Rico Manufacturers Association, 2004

Sources
congente.org/index2.php?option=com_content&do_pdf=1&id=59

References

Secretaries of Economic Development and Commerce of Puerto Rico
Living people
Year of birth missing (living people)